Pedro Alejandrino del Solar Gabans (November 26, 1829 – June 6, 1909) was a Peruvian lawyer, journalist and diplomat. He was born in Lima, Peru. He graduated from the National University of San Marcos and served on its faculty. He served as the President of the Chamber of Deputies from May 1886 to June 1886. He was three-time Prime Minister of Peru (June–October 1886, Nov 1886 – August 1887, April 1889 – February 1890). He served as the first vice president from 1890 to 1894. He also served as minister of justice, and in the Senate of Peru.

References

Bibliography
 Basadre, Jorge: Historia de la República del Perú. 1822 - 1933, Octava Edición, corregida y aumentada. Tomo 9. Editada por el Diario "La República" de Lima y la Universidad "Ricardo Palma". Impreso en Santiago de Chile, 1998.
 Chirinos Soto, Enrique: Historia de la República (1821-1930). Tomo I. Lima, AFA Editores Importadores S.A., 1985.
 Tauro del Pino, Alberto: Enciclopedia Ilustrada del Perú. Tercera Edición. Tomo 15, SAL/SZY. Lima, PEISA, 2001. 
 Vargas Ugarte, Rubén: Historia General del Perú. Tomo XI. Primera Edición. Editor Carlos Milla Batres. Lima, Perú, 1971.

1829 births
1909 deaths
Vice presidents of Peru
19th-century Peruvian lawyers
Peruvian diplomats
People from Lima
Presidents of the Chamber of Deputies of Peru
Peruvian Ministers of Justice
Peruvian journalists
Male journalists
National University of San Marcos alumni
Academic staff of the National University of San Marcos
Members of the Senate of Peru